Bailey's blind snake (Trilepida anthracina) is a species of snake in the family Leptotyphlopidae. The species is endemic to Ecuador.

Geographic range
In Ecuador T. anthracina is found in Abituagua, Balzapamba, Baños de Agua Santa, and Zamora.

Habitat

Description
Its coloration is uniformly black, both dorsally and ventrally.

Behavior
T. anthracina is fossorial and sometimes diurnal.

Diet
T. anthracina preys upon termites and insect larvae.

Reproduction
T. anthracina is oviparous.

References

Further reading
Adalsteinsson SA, Branch WR, Trape S, Vitt LJ, Hedges SB (2009). "Molecular phylogeny, classification, and biogeography of snakes of the family Leptotyphlopidae (Reptilia, Squamata)". Zootaxa 2244: 1-50. (Tricheilostoma anthracinum, new combination).
Bailey JR (1946). "Leptotyphlops anthracinus, a new blind snake from eastern Ecuador". Occasional Papers of the Museum of Zoology, University of Michigan (492): 1–5. (Leptotyphlops anthracinus, new species).
Freiberg M (1982). Snakes of South America. Hong Kong: T.F.H. Publications. 189 pp. . (Leptotyphlops anthracinus, p.  117).
Hedges SB (2011). "The type species of the threadsnake genus Tricheilostoma Jan revisited (Squamata, Leptotyphlopidae)". Zootaxa 3027: 63–64. (Trilepida anthracina, new combination, p. 63).

Trilepida
Reptiles described in 1946